Cats Without Claws is the twelfth studio album by American pop singer Donna Summer, released on September 11, 1984. Summer had achieved monumental fame during the disco era of the 1970s, and in 1980 was signed to Geffen Records. She had had some degree of success with them, though her previous album had been released on another label. It peaked at No. 40 on Billboards album chart, failing to attain the success of its predecessor which peaked at No. 9.

Her previous studio album, She Works Hard for the Money (1983), had been her most successful since the disco era, and as a result, its producer Michael Omartian was asked to produce the next studio album as well. Again the majority of tracks were written by Summer and Omartian, though a couple of other writers were credited including Summer's husband Bruce Sudano. As with the previous studio album, Cats Without Claws was pop and dance oriented but included soulful ballads. The album also contained a cover version of "There Goes My Baby", originally made popular by the Drifters, which became the first single. Although Summer requested "Oh Billy Please" as the first single, again Geffen and his executives rejected her request. A gospel song written by Reba Rambo and Dony McGuire entitled "Forgive Me" would win Summer a Grammy Award for Best Inspirational Performance.

The album received mixed reviews from critics, with some calling it "occasionally silly". 

Cats Without Claws produced three singles: "There Goes My Baby", "Supernatural Love" (also released as a 12" Single) and "Eyes", "There Goes My Baby" reached No. 21 on the pop chart. Further 12" dance remixes included "Eyes" and "I'm Free".

Commercial performance
Cats Without Claws peaked at number 40 on the Billboard 200 chart and spent only 17 weeks on the chart. The album failed to attain the success of its predecessor, She Works Hard for the Money, which peaked at number 9. In the UK, it reached a peak of number 69 on the UK Albums Chart, and was commercially unsuccessful.

As of 2022, the only available physical version of the album is Vinyl, since all the original CD releases have now gone out of print. It is possible a 40th Anniversary Edition might be released on its 40th Birthday in 2024.

Track listing

Personnel 
Credits are adapted from the Cats Without Claws liner notes.

Musicians
 Donna Summer – lead vocals
 Michael Omartian – keyboards, additional drums, additional percussion
 Erich Bulling – Yamaha DX1 and Yamaha DX7 programming
 Paul Jackson Jr. – guitars
 Michael Landau – guitars
 Nathan East – bass guitar
 Mike Baird – drums
 Paulinho da Costa – percussion
 Gary Herbig – saxophone solos
 Dara Bernard – backing vocals 
 Mary Ellen Bernard –  backing vocals 
 Cydney Davis – backing vocals 
 Siedah Garrett – backing vocals 
 Khaliq Glover – backing vocals 
 Portia Griffin – backing vocals 
 Susannah Melvoin – backing vocals 
 Bruce Sudano – backing vocals 
 Gene Van Buren – backing vocals 
 Kin Vassy – backing vocals 
 Terry Williams – backing vocals

Production and artwork
 Michael Omartian – producer, arrangements 
 John Guess – engineer, mixing (1, 3, 5, 7-10)
 Jürgen Koppers – mixing (2, 4, 6)
 David Ahlert – second engineer
 Larry Ferguson – second engineer
 Tom Fouce – second engineer
 Ross Palone – second engineer
 Steve Hall – mastering at Future Disc (Hollywood, California)
 Ronnie Puccinelli – production coordinator
 Chris Whorf – art direction 
 Jeffrey Fey – design 
 Harry Langdon – photography 
 Susan Munao Management Co. Inc. – management

Charts

Weekly charts

Single

References

External links
 

1984 albums
Donna Summer albums
Albums produced by Michael Omartian
Geffen Records albums
New wave albums by American artists